Titus Aurelius Fulvus was a Roman consul and grandfather of the emperor Antoninus Pius; as his son by the same name was Pius's father.

Biography 
Titus Aurelius Fulvus was a supporter of Vespasian during the Year of Four Emperors. A provincial from Nemausus, Gaul (modern Nîmes, France), he gained his military experience as legatus legionis or commander of the Legio III Gallica in the East under Corbulo. When the legion was transferred to Moesia, in February 69 AD, he led them to victory over 9,000 Rhoxolani horsemen on the Roman side of the Danube.

It was while legatus of Legio III that he convinced the Illyrian armies to support Vespasian; as a reward, Fulvus was summoned to Vespasian's side in Alexandria during the critical period between Vitellius' death in December 69 and the emperor's departure for Rome in August of September of the following year. Further honors included a suffect consulship early in Vespasian's reign (between 72 and 74 AD, the year is uncertain), and elevation to the patrician class.

As an amicus of Vespasian and his sons, Fulvus held a number of senior posts, but only three are attested: governorship of Hispania Citerior, a second consulship in 85 AD (ordinary, as colleague of Domitian), and urban prefect. Noting that Fulvus was part of the "Hispano-Narbonensian nexus" that emerged in the later first century AD, Brian W. Jones observes that Fulvus, as a "senior consular of wide experience, he would have been an invaluable member of Domitian's court".

See also
 List of Roman consuls

References

Aurelii Fulvi
Imperial Roman consuls
1st-century Romans